Brna is a village on the southern coast of the island of Korčula in western Croatia.

In the 19th century, Brna served as an overnight base for fishermen from nearby Smokvica, and had a pier that was used for the export of wine. During the 1970s, the village became populated with summer homes for Smokvica residents, and now caters to tourists with a hotel complex and numerous apartments.

To the northwest is the bay of Istruga, with deposits of therapeutic mud.

External links

Smokvica Tourist Organisation, Brna
Korčula info - Brna
Hotel "Feral", Brna

Korčula
Populated places in Dubrovnik-Neretva County